Macalister Bailey "Mac" Wright (born 22 January 1998) is an Australian cricketer. He made his List A debut for Cricket Australia XI in the 2017–18 JLT One-Day Cup on 27 September 2017.

Domestic career
Wright played for Cricket Australia XI in the 2017–18 JLT One-Day Cup. He made his List A debut in the tournament against South Australia. He bowled 3 overs and conceded 23 runs. He played three matches for the tournament, scoring 42 runs but failing to take his first List A wicket.

In September 2018, he was named in the Hobart Hurricanes' squad for the 2018 Abu Dhabi T20 Trophy. He made his Twenty20 debut for the Hobart Hurricanes in the 2018 Abu Dhabi T20 Trophy on 5 October 2018. On 20 November 2019, in the 2019–20 Marsh One-Day Cup, Wright scored his maiden century in List A cricket. He made his first-class debut on 29 November 2019, for Tasmania in the 2019–20 Sheffield Shield season.

Personal life
In 2022, Wright was studying for a Bachelor of Arts (Psychology) at Deakin University.

References

External links
 

1998 births
Living people
Australian cricketers
Place of birth missing (living people)
Cricket Australia XI cricketers
Hobart Hurricanes cricketers
Tasmania cricketers
Cricketers from Melbourne
People from Ferntree Gully, Victoria